A general election was held in the U.S. state of Arkansas on November 8, 2022. All of Arkansas' executive officers were up for election as well as all four of the state's seats in the United States House of Representatives and a U.S. senator. Primaries were held on May 24, 2022, with runoff primaries on June 21. Polls were open from 7:30 AM to 7:30 PM CST.

Governor

Incumbent Republican governor Asa Hutchinson was term-limited and is not eligible for re-election. Two Republicans and five Democrats were qualified to be major party candidates. Following the primary elections, Republican Sarah Sanders faced Democrat Chris Jones in the general election. 

Sanders easily won the general election.

Lieutenant governor

The incumbent lieutenant governor was term-limited and instead ran for attorney general. Two Democrats, six Republicans, and a Libertarian ran for lieutenant governor. In November 2021, retiring attorney general Leslie Rutledge withdrew from the governor's race and ran for lieutenant governor instead. Rutledge won the Republican primary and easily defeated Democrat Kelly Krout in the general election.

Secretary of state

Incumbent secretary John Thurston ran for re-election. Originally facing two other Republicans and two Democrats, Thurston won the Republican primary and defeated Democratic candidate Anna Beth Gorman in the general election.

Attorney general

Incumbent attorney general Leslie Rutledge is term-limited and not eligible for re-election, and instead ran for lieutenant governor. Incumbent lieutenant governor Tim Griffin won the Republican primary on May 24 and defeated Democrat Jesse Gibson in the general election.

State treasurer

Incumbent treasurer Dennis Milligan is term-limited and not eligible for re-election, and instead ran for state auditor. In February 2021, Republican Mathew Pitsch declared his candidacy for treasurer of Arkansas in the 2022 election, though lost his party primary to Arkansas House representative Mark Lowery. Lowery defeated Democratic candidate Pam Whitaker in the general election.

State auditor
Incumbent auditor Andrea Lea is term-limited and unable to run for re-election. Term-limited state treasurer Dennis Milligan entered the race as the Republican candidate and won against Democratic candidate Diamond Arnold-Johnson and Libertarian Simeon Snow.

Candidates

Republicans
Dennis Milligan, state treasurer (2015–present)

Libertarian
Simeon Snow, candidate for State Auditor

Results

Commissioner of state lands

Incumbent land commissioner Tommy Land ran for re-election and defeated Democratic candidate Darlene Gaines in the general election.

Candidates

Republicans
Tommy Land, incumbent land commissioner

Democrats
Darlene Goldi Gaines, business executive

United States Senate
Incumbent Senator John Boozman ran for a third term, easily defeating Democratic challenger Natalie James.

United States House of Representatives

District 1 
Republican incumbent Rick Crawford ran for a seventh term, defeating Democratic challenger Monte Hodges.

District 2 
Republican incumbent French Hill ran for a fifth term, defeating Democratic challenger Quintessa Hathaway.

District 3 
Republican incumbent Steve Womack ran for a seventh term, defeating Democratic challenger Lauren Mallett-Hays.

District 4 
Republican incumbent Bruce Westerman ran for a fifth term, defeating Democratic challenger John White.

Ballot Measures

Issue 1 
The "Legislative Authority to Call a Special Session Amendment" would have given the legislature the authority to call itself into an extraordinary session, instead of the governor. The measure failed passage.

Issue 2 
The "60% Supermajority Vote Requirement for Constitutional Amendments and Ballot Initiatives Measure" would have required 60% majority for voters to pass ballot measures, instead of the required simple majority of 50%. The measure failed passage.

Issue 3 
The "Government Burden of Free Exercise of Religion Amendment" would have amended the state constitution to include language that the government cannot burden a person's freedom of religion. The measure failed passage.

Issue 4 
The "Marijuana Legalization Initiative" would have legalized recreational use of marijuana for people over 21 years old and enacted a tax on marijuana sales. The measure failed passage.

Notes

References

External links
Candidates at Vote Smart 
Candidates at Ballotpedia

 
Arkansas